James Lesure (born September 21, 1970) is an American television actor, best known for roles on the NBC/The WB sitcom For Your Love (1998–2002), and NBC comedy-drama Las Vegas (2003–2008), Girlfriends' Guide to Divorce (2017–2018) and Good Girls (2018–2020).

Early life and education
Lesure was born in Los Angeles, California. He attended the University of Southern California and the USC School of Dramatic Arts. During his student years, Lesure began appearing on stage, performing in Hair and The Island.

Career 
Lesure has had guest starring roles in a number of television shows during the 1990s, including; Mad About You, Martin, Seinfeld, and NYPD Blue. His big break came in 1998, when he was cast as co-lead opposite Holly Robinson Peete in the NBC sitcom For Your Love. It was canceled after six episodes, but was picked up by The WB Network. It ran there for four years before its 2002 cancellation. From 2003 to 2008, he starred as Mike Cannon on the NBC comedy-drama Las Vegas.

Lesure had recurring roles on Alias, Half & Half, Studio 60 on the Sunset Strip, Lipstick Jungle, The New Adventures of Old Christine and Blue Bloods. He also starred as basketball star Alonzo Pope on the short-lived ABC comedy series Mr. Sunshine in 2011 alongside Matthew Perry and Allison Janney. From 2012 to 2014, he starred on the TBS sitcom Men at Work. In 2014 he guest starred on CSI: Crime Scene Investigation as Dr. Emmet in the episode "Bad Blood". In 2015 Lesher had a recurring role as Alex McBride on Blue Bloods. 2016, he starred in the ABC comedy series Uncle Buck opposite Mike Epps and Nia Long. In 2017, he appeared on Girlfriends' Guide to Divorce as a baseball coach during seasons 3, 4 and 5. In 2018, he had a recurring role as an FBI agent on Good Girls. Later in 2018, he had a recurring role as Congressman Trey Thomason on Salvation. In 2019 he appeared as Henry, the boyfriend of Sarah Jessica Parker's lead character Frances on Season 3 of the HBO series Divorce.

Lesure appeared in a main role in the 2021 television show, Rebel.

Filmography

Film

Television

References

External links 

1970 births
African-American male actors
American male film actors
American male television actors
Living people
Male actors from Los Angeles
USC School of Dramatic Arts alumni
20th-century American male actors
21st-century American male actors
20th-century African-American people
21st-century African-American people